Jocelyn Noel Christine Playfair (21 August 190414 May 1997) was a British novelist.

She was born in Lucknow, British India, the daughter of Lieutenant-Colonel Noel Malan. Both of her parents were of French Huguenot descent. The year she was born (1904), her father accompanied Francis Younghusband on the Younghusband Expedition to Tibet.

She married Ian Playfair in 1930, who was in the Royal Engineers and later was appointed the rank of Major-General. After the birth of their two sons, the couple returned to Britain in the late 1930s. She wrote ten books between 1939 and 1952.

She died in Hounslow, London, on 14May 1997.

Bibliography
Murder without Mystery (1939)
Storm in a Village (1940)
Eastern Week-End (1940)
The Mill (1942)
A House in the Country (1944), republished by Persephone Books in 2002
Men Without Armour (1946)
The Desirable Residence (1947)
The Fire and the Rose (1948)
A Man called Miranda (1949)
The Nettlebed (1952)

References

Links
 Information on A House in the Country
 Author Profile at Persephone Books
 Jocelyn Playfair at WorldCat

1904 births
1997 deaths
Writers from Lucknow
British women novelists
20th-century British women writers
20th-century British novelists
British people in colonial India